Kathryn Deans is an Australian children's fantasy author. She was raised in the Dandenong Ranges near Melbourne in Australia.

Works
 All The Flowers Of Babylon, in issue 25/26 of the Speculative Fiction magazine Aurealis
 Shimmer, a children's fantasy novel (book one of the troll trilogy) published by Pan MacMillan, 2005
 Glow, a children's fantasy novel (book two of the troll trilogy) published by Pan MacMillan, 2006
 Shine, a children's fantasy novel (book three of the troll trilogy) published by Pan MacMillan, 2008
 Meaner Than Fiction, an adult true-crime novel published by Five Mile Press

External links
 Official website
 Infinitas Bookshop Biography

Australian fantasy writers
Australian women novelists
Year of birth missing (living people)
Living people
Australian children's writers
20th-century Australian novelists
Australian women children's writers
Women science fiction and fantasy writers
20th-century Australian women writers